Michael Scott Neiberg is an American historian, who specializes in 20th-century military history.

Career 
Neiberg serves as the inaugural Chair of War Studies in the Department of National Security and Strategy at the United States Army War College.  He is also a senior fellow in the Center for the Study of America and the West at the Foreign Policy Research Institute.

Selected works
Making Citizen-Soldiers: ROTC and the Ideology of American Military Service. Cambridge, MA: Harvard University Press, 2000.  
Foch: Supreme Allied Commander in the Great War. Washington, DC: Brassey's, 2003.  
 Warfare & Society in Europe: 1898 to the Present. New York: Routledge, 2004.  
Warfare in World History. New York: Routledge, 2005.  
Fighting the Great War: A Global History. Cambridge, MA: Harvard University Press, 2005. 
Fascism. Aldershot, England: Ashgate, 2006.  
The World War I Reader: [Primary and Secondary Sources]. New York: New York University Press, 2007.  
The Nineteenth Century. Westport, CT: Greenwood, 2007.  
The Second Battle of the Marne. Bloomington: Indiana University Press, 2008.  
The Western Front 1914-1916. London: Amber, 2008.  
Dance of the Furies: Europe and the Outbreak of World War I. Cambridge, MA: Belknap Press of Harvard University Press, 2011.  
The Blood of Free Men: The Liberation of Paris, 1944. New York: Basic Books, 2012.  
The Military Atlas of World War I. New York: Chartwell Books, 2014.  
Potsdam: The End of World War II and the Remaking of Europe. New York: Basic Books, 2015.   
The Path to War: How the First World War Created Modern America. Oxford University Press, 2016.  
The Treaty of Versailles: A Very Short Introduction. Oxford [UK]; New York: Oxford University Press, 2019.  
When France Fell: The Vichy Crisis and the Fate of the Anglo-American Alliance. Cambridge, MA: Harvard University Press, 2021.

References

External links 

20th-century American historians
21st-century American historians
American military historians
Living people
Year of birth missing (living people)
United States Army War College faculty
Historians of World War II